Buko pandan cake, also known as pandan macapuno cake or coconut pandan cake, is a Filipino chiffon or sponge cake (mamón) flavored with extracts from boiled pandan leaves and frosted with cream with young coconut strips and/or macapuno as toppings or fillings. It is a cake version of the traditional Filipino pairing of buko pandan. It is similar to the pandan cakes in other parts of Southeast Asia, but differ in that it is not served plain. It is always frosted with cream and coconut.

See also
Ube cake
Mango cake
Coconut cake

References

Philippine cuisine
Sponge cakes